Acta Senatus, or Commentarii Senatus, were minutes of the discussions and decisions of the Roman Senate. The keeping of them was continued by Augustus, but their publication was forbidden. A young senator was chosen to draw up these , which were kept in the imperial archives and public libraries. Special permission from the city prefect was necessary in order to examine them.

References

Ancient Roman government
Latin words and phrases
Roman law